Great Men Academy (lit. "Great Men Academy Gentleman in Love") is a 2019 Thai drama series starring Chanyapuk Numprasop, Teeradon Supapunpinyo, Krissanapoom Pibulsonggram, Lapat Ngamchaweng, Chonlathorn Kongyingyong, Jackrin Kungwankiatichai, Sivakorn Adulsuttikul, and Paris Intarakomalyasut. It aired on LINE TV from February 6 to March 27, 2019 and has 8 episodes. The series is produced by Nadao Bangkok and Line Thailand, and written & directed by Wanwea and Weawwan Hongvivatana.

Seven of the nine members of Nine by Nine appeared in this series, namely as Teeradon, Krissanapoom, Paris, Chonlathorn, Sivakorn, Lapat, and Jackrin. It is the second television series project of the group after In Family We Trust (2018).

Plot
Love (Chanyapuk Numprasop) has always been a fan of the popular guy Vier (Paris Intarakomalyasut) of the famous all boys high school Great Men Academy, but she has never had the chance to meet him. One day, she sees the mystical unicorn rumored to fulfill wishes and wished for her love for Vier to get a chance.

Unfortunately, the unicorn interpreted her wishes in a different way and Love wakes up to find herself in a male's body. She is able to switch between genders under the condition that she must return as a girl before midnight each night. Love attends Great Men Academy as a guy, and works through the complications of winning Vier's heart and meeting new people while trying to keep her identity a secret.

Cast

Main characters
 Chanyapuk Numprasop as Tawanwat Phongwilai (Love (Woman)/Mon)
 Teeradon Supapunpinyo as Tawanwat Phongwilai (Love (Man))
 Krissanapoom Pibulsonggram as Pakorn Chintaphaisali (Tangmo)
 Paris Intarakomalyasut as Sivakorn Wisetphiriya (Vier)
 Narikun Ketprapakorn as Mahatmutra Phisutmaitri (Rose)
 Chonlathorn Kongyingyong as Mahatmutra Phisutmaitri (Sean)
 Sivakorn Adulsuttikul as Phasu Wisaisombun (Good)
 Lapat Ngamchaweng as Napat Mahasal (Nuclear)
 Jackrin Kungwankiatichai as Arthit Rutrangsi (Menn)
 Wannapa Pomjanda as You
 Phakamas Pomjanda as Me

Supporting characters
 Smith Arayaskul as Phon Wisetphiriya/Vier's Father
 Penpak Sirikul as Love & Good's Mother
 Anorma Sarunsikarin as Teacher Kate
 Nophand Boonyai as Teacher Oh
 Nimit Luksameepong as Teacher Chang
 Nichaphat Chatchaipholrat as Som
 Atitaya Craig as Fon
 Waranya Munkaew as Aunty Phon/Director Venus
 Chayin Prasongkhuamdi as Ken

Soundtrack
 Nine by Nine — ผู้โชคดี ("The Lucky One")
 mints – เหลือ ("fine.")
 Jintara Poonlarp – เต่างอย ("Tao Ngoi")
 Stamp – ผู้โชคดี ("The Lucky One" Stamp Version)

References

External links 
Great Men Academy  on Line TV 
Great Men Academy on Netflix 
 
 Great Men Academy สุภาพบุรุษสุดที่เลิฟ (ไลน์ทีวี)

Television series by Nadao Bangkok
2019 Thai television series debuts
2019 Thai television series endings
Thai LGBT-related television shows
Line TV original programming